Forsman & Bodenfors is a global creative collective. Since founded in Sweden in 1986 it has consistently been in the top tier of international agency rankings. Forsman & Bodenfors has won over 100 Lions and six Grand Prix at the Cannes Lions International Festival of Creativity.

Recognition
It has been recognized by The Gunn Report as the best advertising agency in the world and named among the top three Independent Agencies of the Decade at Cannes.  Fast Company nominated the agency on their list of Most Innovative Companies and Contagious has praised Forsman & Bodenfors as one of the best and bravest agencies in the world. It is also the first agency to achieve global gender pay equity certification by Fair Pay Workplace for an ongoing commitment to equal pay for equal work.

Clients
Forsman and Bodenfors is part of the marketing and communications group Stagwell Inc. Clients include Volvo Cars, Diageo, General Mills, Netflix, Goldman Sachs, Church & Dwight and Procter & Gamble.

References

External links
Official Website
Stagwell Group Website

Advertising agencies of Sweden
Companies based in Gothenburg